Qualification for the 2004 African Cup of Nations.

Qualified teams

 (qualified as holders)

 (qualified as hosts)

Qualifying round
Of the 52 nations, only Somalia didn't take part, Cameroon qualified as holders and Tunisia qualified as hosts. Furthermore, Djibouti, São Tomé and Príncipe, and Guinea-Bissau withdrew. The remaining 46 teams then ended up being divided into 7 groups of 4 teams and 6 groups of 3 teams, with the 13 group winners and the best runner-up from the groups containing 4 sides, qualifying for the finals. Qualifying took place between 6 September 2002 and 6 July 2003.

Group 1

Group 2

Group 3

Tanzania pulled out for financial reasons and the game was awarded to Sudan.

Group 4

Group 5

The match was abandoned at 3-0 in 85' when Mauritania were reduced to six players following 5 red cards. The result stood.

Group 6

Group 7

Group 8

Group 9

Group 10

Group 11

Group 12

Group 13

Best runner-up
The best runner-up from groups with four teams would qualify for the finals.

External links
Details at RSSSF

Africa Cup of Nations qualification
Qual
Qual
qualification